The , signed as Route 14, is one of the tolled routes of the Hanshin Expressway system serving the Keihanshin area in Kansai, Japan. It travels in a northwest to southeast direction from the Chūō ward of Osaka, beginning at a junction with the Loop Route, to a junction with the Hanwa Expressway, Kinki Expressway, and Nishi-Meihan Expressway in the city of Matsubara.

Route description

The Matsubara Route travels in a northwest to southeast direction from the Chūō ward of Osaka, beginning at a junction with the Loop Route, to a junction with the Hanwa Expressway, Kinki Expressway, and Nishi-Meihan Expressway in the city of Matsubara. Serving as the primary expressway route from central Osaka to Matsubara and points beyond in eastern Osaka Prefecture and Nara Prefecture, the highway winds its way through the wards of Osaka. Much of this section of the expressway lies above the Tanimachi Line of the Osaka Metro between Abeno Station and Kire-Uriwari Station. After crossing over the Yamato River into Matsubara, the expressway has a junction with Yamatogawa Route that parallels the river from the junction to its end near Osaka Bay. Before ending at the junction with the Hanwa Expressway, Kinki Expressway, and Nishi-Meihan Expressway, the expressway briefly crosses back into the city of Osaka before returning into Matsubara where the junction lies.

History
The first section of the expressway near the Loop Route was completed in 1970. The majority of the expressway was completed by 1980 after the opening of an  section. A mini parking area once operated between Miyake and Matsubara junctions, it has since been removed. On 21 March 2013, the expressway was linked to the Yamatogawa Route at Miyake Junction.

List of interchanges
The entire expressway lies within Osaka Prefecture.

See also

References

External links
 

Roads in Osaka Prefecture
14
1970 establishments in Japan